Zach Duckworth (born July 1, 1987) is an American politician and member of the Minnesota Senate. A Republican, he represents District 58 in the southern Twin Cities metropolitan area.

Early life, education, and career 
Duckworth was born in Lakeville and graduated from Lakeville High School. He has a BA and MBA from the University of Saint Thomas.

Minnesota Senate 
Duckworth was elected to the Minnesota Senate in 2020, defeating Democratic-Farmer-Labor incumbent Matt Little. Duckworth sits on the Senate housing, education, veterans, and metropolitan government committees, and serves as an assistant majority leader.

Electoral history

References

External links 

Senator Zach Duckworth official Minnesota Senate website
Duckworth for Senate official campaign website

1964 births
21st-century American women politicians
Candidates in the 2018 United States elections
Augsburg University alumni
Living people
Republican Party Minnesota state senators
People from South St. Paul, Minnesota
University at Buffalo alumni
Women state legislators in Minnesota
21st-century American politicians
People from Lakeville, Minnesota